The Tecate/Telmex Grand Prix of Monterrey was a round of the Champ Car World Series held on a street circuit at Fundidora park in Monterrey, Mexico. It was first held in 2001, and it was held for the last time in 2006.

Results

2001: Race shortened due to two hour time limit.

References

External links
 Champ Car Stats: Monterrey archive